The Maastricht Hours is a book of hours that was produced in the vicinity of Liège early in the 14th century and is now among the Stowe manuscripts of the British Library. It is known for its colourful and imaginative miniatures, often on animal themes. It has been fully digitised and is available on the British Library website.

References

External links
Stowe MS 17, digital version on the British Library website.

14th-century illuminated manuscripts
Stowe manuscripts
Illuminated books of hours
Liège